Ptocheuusa guimarensis is a moth of the family Gelechiidae. It is found on the Canary Islands.

The wingspan is 7.5–9 mm. The forewings are pale fawn brown with whitish cinereous (ash grey) lines and streaks. The hindwings are pale grey.

References

Moths described in 1908
Ptocheuusa